The 209th Coastal Division was an infantry division of the Royal Italian Army during World War II. Royal Italian Army coastal divisions were second line divisions formed with reservists and equipped with second rate materiel. They were often commanded by officers called out of retirement.

History 
The division was activated on 20 April 1943 in Bari by expanding the IX Coastal Brigade. The division was assigned to IX Army Corps and had its headquarter in Noicattaro. The division was responsible for the coastal defense of the coast of northern Apulia between the river Saccione and Torre Testa del Gallico near Brindisi.

After the Armistice of Cassibile was announced on 8 September 1943 the division immediately fought German forces and then surrendered on 11 September to the British 1st Airborne Division. On 15 September the Allies reactivated the division, which joined the Italian Co-belligerent Army and for the rest of the Italian campaign performed rear area security and work duties as 209th Division for the British Eighth Army. The division was disbanded in autumn 1945.

Organization 
 209th Coastal Division, in Noicattaro
 112th Coastal Regiment
 3x Coastal battalions
 15th Coastal Regiment
 3x Coastal battalions
 41st Coastal Artillery Regiment
 4x Coastal artillery groups
 IX Machine Gun Battalion
 209th Mixed Engineer Company
 264th Anti-paratroopers Unit
 432nd Anti-paratroopers Unit
 434th Anti-paratroopers Unit
 209th Carabinieri Section
 185th Field Post Office
 Division Services

Attached to the division:
 Harbor Defense Command Bari, in Bari
 XIX Garrison Battalion
 XLI Bersaglieri Battalion
 CXXXV Coastal Battalion
 CXCVI Coastal Artillery Group
 CXCVII Coastal Artillery Group
 LXXXIX Coastal Artillery Group
 15th Anti-tank Company (47/32 anti-tank guns)
 692nd Machine Gun Company
 4th Airfield Defense Grouping, at Bari Air Base (Royal Italian Air Force)
 XI Airmen Battalion
 VIII Anti-aircraft Artillery Group
 3x Anti-aircraft artillery batteries
 CCLIII CC.NN. Battalion

Commanding officers 
The division's commanding officers were:

 Generale di Brigata Luigi Amato (20 April 1943 - ?)
 Generale di Divisione Roberto Olmi (1945)

References 

 
 

 
Coastal divisions of Italy
Infantry divisions of Italy in World War II